Jesus the Worker University Institute (IUJO), (Instituto Universitario Jesús Obrero) was opened by the Jesuits in Caracas, Venezuela, in 1997 to educate the poorer sector of society.

Courses
Current course offerings:

See also
 List of Jesuit sites

References  

Universities and colleges in Spain
Jesuit universities and colleges in Spain
Educational institutions established in 1973